Route 130 is a state highway in southwestern Connecticut, running from Fairfield to Stratford, generally parallel to I-95.

Route description

Route 130 begins at an intersection with US 1 in Fairfield and heads east into Bridgeport.  In Bridgeport, it intersects I-95, then passes under Route 8 and I-95 twice without junctions before crossing into Stratford.  In Stratford, it passes under I-95 again without a junction before intersecting I-95 a second and ending at another intersection with US 1.

Route 130 is designated the A.W. Penn Memorial Highway from the Fairfield-Bridgeport town line to State Street.

History

In 1922, state roads were given number designations in New England for the first time. Modern Route 130 was originally part of New England Route 1. In 1927, the U.S. Highway system was created and New England Route 1 became part of U.S. Route 1 (US 1). In 1932, an alternate route of US 1 (US 1 Alt. was designated along North Avenue, Boston Avenue, and Barnum Avenue further inland (now modern US 1). In 1963, US 1A in the Bridgeport area was deleted and re-designated as US 1. The original US 1 alignment along Fairfield Avenue, State Street, and Stratford Avenue became unsigned state roads, with designations of SR 771 (Fairfield-Bridgeport) and SR 769 (Bridgeport-Stratford). In 1992, these were re-designated as modern Route 130.

Major intersections

References

Transportation in Fairfield County, Connecticut
130
U.S. Route 1
Fairfield, Connecticut
Transportation in Bridgeport, Connecticut
Stratford, Connecticut
1992 establishments in Connecticut